Jacco Eltingh and Paul Haarhuis were the defending champions, but Eltingh did not compete this year. Haarhuis competed with American Jared Palmer as the seventh seed, but they were eliminated in the second round by Javier Sánchez and Jan Siemerink.

First seeds Mahesh Bhupathi and Leander Paes won in the final by defeating the unseeded team of Goran Ivanišević and Jeff Tarango, 6–2, 7–5.

This was the first major marked the beginning of Bryan brothers' 76-consecutive slam appearance streak, which ended with Bob Bryan's withdrawal at the 2018 French Open. Mike Bryan had his record run of 84 consecutive Grand Slam main draw appearances until the 2020 Australian Open, where he and Bob eventually retired from that sport.

Seeds

Draw

Finals

Top half

Section 1
{{16TeamBracket-Compact-Tennis3
| RD1=First round
| RD2=Second round
| RD3=Third round
| RD4=Quarterfinals
| RD1-seed01=1
| RD1-team01= M Bhupathi L Paes
| RD1-score01-1=6
| RD1-score01-2=4
| RD1-score01-3=7
| RD1-seed02= 
| RD1-team02= J I Carrasco J Velasco Jr.
| RD1-score02-1=2
| RD1-score02-2=6
| RD1-score02-3=5
| RD1-seed03=WC
| RD1-team03= J-R Lisnard M Llodra
| RD1-score03-1=4
| RD1-score03-2=6
| RD1-score03-3=7
| RD1-seed04= 
| RD1-team04=
| RD1-score04-1=6
| RD1-score04-2=4
| RD1-score04-3=5
| RD1-seed05= 
| RD1-team05= M Kohlmann T Vanhoudt
| RD1-score05-1=4
| RD1-score05-2=3
| RD1-score05-3= 
| RD1-seed06= 
| RD1-team06= L Bale G Stafford
| RD1-score06-1=6
| RD1-score06-2=6
| RD1-score06-3= 
| RD1-seed07= 
| RD1-team07= J Greenhalgh G Silcock
| RD1-score07-1=3
| RD1-score07-2=4
| RD1-score07-3= 
| RD1-seed08=15
| RD1-team08= P Norval K Ullyett
| RD1-score08-1=6
| RD1-score08-2=6
| RD1-score08-3= 
| RD1-seed09=10
| RD1-team09= J Novák D Rikl
| RD1-score09-1=5
| RD1-score09-2=6
| RD1-score09-3=6
| RD1-seed10= 
| RD1-team10= E Nicolas G Puentes
| RD1-score10-1=7
| RD1-score10-2=1
| RD1-score10-3=0
| RD1-seed11= 
| RD1-team11= C Haggard D Hrbatý
| RD1-score11-1=5
| RD1-score11-2=2
| RD1-score11-3= 
| RD1-seed12= 
| RD1-team12= B Coupe P Goldstein
| RD1-score12-1=7
| RD1-score12-2=6
| RD1-score12-3= 
| RD1-seed13=WC
| RD1-team13= A Dupuis O Mutis
| RD1-score13-1=2
| RD1-score13-2=62
| RD1-score13-3= 
| RD1-seed14= 
| RD1-team14= D Bowen E Ran
| RD1-score14-1=6
| RD1-score14-2=77
| RD1-score14-3= 
| RD1-seed15= 
| RD1-team15= N Broad R Koenig
| RD1-score15-1=65
| RD1-score15-2=64
| RD1-score15-3= 
| RD1-seed16=8
| RD1-team16= E Ferreira R Leach
| RD1-score16-1=77
| RD1-score16-2=77
| RD1-score16-3= 
| RD2-seed01=1
| RD2-team01= M Bhupathi L Paes
| RD2-score01-1=6
| RD2-score01-2=6
| RD2-score01-3= 
| RD2-seed02=WC
| RD2-team02= J-R Lisnard M Llodra
| RD2-score02-1=2
| RD2-score02-2=4
| RD2-score02-3= 
| RD2-seed03= 
| RD2-team03= L Bale G Stafford
| RD2-score03-1=3
| RD2-score03-2=4
| RD2-score03-3= 
| RD2-seed04=15
| RD2-team04= P Norval K Ullyett
| RD2-score04-1=6
| RD2-score04-2=6
| RD2-score04-3= 
| RD2-seed05=10
| RD2-team05= J Novák D Rikl
| RD2-score05-1=6
| RD2-score05-2=7
| RD2-score05-3= 
| RD2-seed06= 
| RD2-team06=
| RD2-score06-1=3
| RD2-score06-2=5
| RD2-score06-3= 
| RD2-seed07= 
| RD2-team07= D Bowen E Ran
| RD2-score07-1=63
| RD2-score07-2=2
| RD2-score07-3= 
| RD2-seed08=9
| RD2-team08= E Ferreira R Leach
| RD2-score08-1=7
| RD2-score08-2=6
| RD2-score08-3= 
| RD3-seed01=1
| RD3-team01=

Section 2

Bottom half

Section 3

Section 4

External links
 Association of Tennis Professionals (ATP) – main draw
1999 French Open – Men's draws and results at the International Tennis Federation

Men's Doubles
French Open by year – Men's doubles